Sporting Club Toulon-Le Las (commonly referred to as Toulon-Le Las) was a football club based in Toulon, France. The club was founded in 1965, and merged with Sporting Toulon Var in 2016, forming Sporting Club Toulon.

References

External links
  

SC Toulon
Defunct football clubs in France
Association football clubs established in 1965
1965 establishments in France
2016 disestablishments in France
Association football clubs disestablished in 2016
Football clubs in Provence-Alpes-Côte d'Azur